Bocquillonia arborea is a species of plant in the family Euphorbiaceae. It is endemic to New Caledonia.

References

arborea
Endemic flora of New Caledonia
Endangered plants
Taxonomy articles created by Polbot